Bhai Bachittar Singh  (6 May 1664 – 22 December 1705), often known with the honorific "Shaheed" (martyr), was a Sikh  hero and a general of Guru Gobind Singh.  His father was Bhai Mani Singh and he came from Alipur Riyasat Multan.

Family background
Bhai Bachittar Singh was the son of Bhai Mani Singh. He made a name for himself when he single-handedly defeated a drunken elephant let loose by the Army of the Mughal Empire during the siege of Lohgarh.

Death
An account cited that after Singh fought on the bank of a stream called Sarsa, where all of his companions perished, he was wounded during an encounter with the Mughal army on his way to Ropar. Bachittar Singh's wounds proved to be fatal. He succumbed to his injuries and died on 8 December 1705. Nihang Khan had the cremation performed secretly the following night.

See also
Nihang Khan
Kotla Nihang Khan Fort
Sikh Ajaibghar

References

 "Regional Briefs: Punjab", The Tribune, 6 May 2001.
 "Punjab places of interest", Indtravel.com.  Accessed 4 April 2007.

Indian military personnel
1664 births
1705 deaths